The Thomasville Subdivision is a railroad line owned by CSX Transportation in Georgia. At its north end it continues south from the Thomasville Yard and at its south end it continues south as the Fitzgerald Subdivision and Jesup Subdivision. At its north end it branches off of the Thomasville Subdivision and at its south end it connects with the Jesup Subdivision.

History

The Thomasville Subdivision was originally a segment the Atlantic and Gulf Railroad, which extended from Savannah to Bainbridge.  The line was built in 1859 just before the start of the American Civil War though it wouldn't be completed to Bainbridge until 1867.  The Atlantic and Gulf Railroad went bankrupt in 1877 and was bought in 1879 by Henry B. Plant and became incorporated into his Plant System.

After the death of Henry Plant in 1899, the Plant System was bought by the Atlantic Coast Line Railroad.  The Atlantic Coast Line would become part of CSX by 1986.

See also
 List of CSX Transportation lines

References

CSX Transportation lines
Georgia (U.S. state) railroads
Rail infrastructure in Georgia (U.S. state)
Rail transportation in Georgia (U.S. state)